The Energy Company Obligation (ECO) is a British Government program. It is designed to offset emissions created by energy company power stations. The first obligation period ran from January 2013 to 31 March 2015. The second obligation period, known as ECO2, is from 1 April 2015 to 31 March 2017.

The Government obligates the larger energy suppliers to help lower-income households improve their energy efficiency.

ECO is the replacement of two previous schemes, the Carbon Emission Reduction Target (CERT) and the Community Energy Saving Programme (CESP). It has been announced that the program will be replaced in 2017 by a less extensive version.

The program focused on heating, in particular improving insulation.

References

External links

Energy Company Obligation - ECO4 - general information website
ECO4 delivery guidance for suppliers from OFGEM

ECO4 eligibility requirements - ECO4 Scheme

Government programs
Emissions reduction
Energy in the United Kingdom
Climate change policy in the United Kingdom